Simon Blumenfeld (25 November 1907 – 13 April 2005) was a British columnist, author, playwright, theatre critic, editor and communist.

Although he described himself as Jewish, he was born to a family of Sicilian refugees, who eventually settled in Whitechapel, in the East End of London. During World War II he served in the Royal Army Ordnance Corps as an expert in German munitions, before becoming a scriptwriter for Stars in Battledress, an army talent show.

At the end of the war he founded the entertainment magazine Band Wagon, with Norman Kark. He adopted a number of pseudonyms for his writing, including Sidney Vauncez (the Yiddish word for moustache), CV Curtis, and Peter Simon. He founded the Weekly Sporting Review, which collapsed when sued for libel by the managers of Tommy Steele; and then Record Mirror with Benny Green.

Simon Blumenfeld died at Barnet Hospital in North London on 13 April 2005, at the age of 97. He had maintained his writing output until a few weeks before his passing, and his name was listed in the Guinness Book of Records as the 'World's Oldest Columnist'. He was cremated at Golders Green Crematorium, where a memorial plaque remains in the 'communist corner'.

Works

Novels
Jew Boy - published in the US as The Iron Garden (1932) [reprinted: Lawrence and Wishart, 1986; London Books, 2011]
Phineas Kahn: Portrait of an Immigrant (1937) [reprinted by Lawrence and Wishart, 1987, with an introduction by Steven Berkoff, and by London Books, 2019, with an introduction by Peter Mason]
Doctor of the Lost (1938) [reprinted by London Books, 2013, with an introduction by Paolo Hewitt]
They Won't Let You Live (1939)
The Catalones Bandit (1947) [as Huck Messer (Yiddish: carving knife)]

Plays
The Battle of Cable Street (1987)

Editor and columnist
Band Wagon
Weekly Sporting Review
Record Mirror
The Stage

Personal
Simon was married to Deborah Blumenfeld, who died in 1960. They had two children, son Eric and daughter Sheba.

Notes

References
Simon Blumenfeld: Obituary Peter Hepple The Guardian, 18 April 2005
Simon Blumenfeld - Columnist, author, playwright, theatre critic, editor and former light entertainment editor of The Stage Press Gazette, 6 May 2008

External links
Rachel Lichtenstein write about Blumenfeld's novel 'Jew Boy'

1907 births
2005 deaths
English columnists
English Jewish writers
English magazine editors
English music journalists
English sportswriters
People from Whitechapel
Golders Green Crematorium
English male novelists
20th-century English novelists
Communist writers
Communist Party of Great Britain members
Jewish socialists
British Army personnel of World War II
Royal Army Ordnance Corps soldiers